Frapin is a Cognac producer based in the town of Segonzac, in the heart of the Grande Champagne region of France.

The Frapin family has been established in the South West of France since 1270, initially as a family of wine-growers. They then became distillers and have continued in this tradition for 20 generations. The Grande Champagne region was where the family eventually settled, establishing their headquarters in the Fontpinot Castle at Segonzac. Today the Frapin estate covers 300 hectares entirely in Grande Champagne, officially listed as Premier Grand Cru du Cognac, of which 200 hectares are planted with the Ugni blanc grape variety.

See also

References

External links

Cognac
Wineries of France
French brands